Bangladesh EP is an EP by English dance music group Joi, released on 26 October 1996 by Nation Records.

Background and release
The aim of Bangladesh EP was to show the conflicts in Bangladesh by foreign countries. The EP was released on 26 October 1996 by Nation Records.

Track listing

References

External links

1996 debut EPs
Nation Records EPs
Joi (band) EPs